Dominica observes Atlantic Standard Time (UTC−4) year-round.

IANA time zone database 
In the IANA time zone database, Dominica is given one zone in the file zone.tab—America/Dominica. "DM" refers to the country's ISO 3166-1 alpha-2 country code. Data for Dominica directly from zone.tab of the IANA time zone database; columns marked with * are the columns from zone.tab itself:

References

External links 
Current time in Dominica at Time.is
Time in Dominica at TimeAndDate

Time in Dominica